Alice is most often used as a feminine given name, used primarily in English and French; however, it has proven popular in some other languages.

Etymology
Alaïs is the Old French form of the name; Alys of Vexin was also known as Alaïs.

Popularity as a given name
In 2015 the name appeared in the top 100 most popular names for baby girls in Australia, Belgium, France, Canada, Ireland, Scotland, England and Wales, and Northern Ireland. In England and Wales it was ranked the 24th most popular name in 2015, but it has been less popular in the US until a recent resurgence. Some sources cite the resurgence starting in 2000, while others showed an up swing starting in 2010 One source attributes this to Tina Fey having named her daughter Alice in 2005, though this is more likely a case of coincidence than causality. Other sources attribute the rise in popularity to media sources such as the Twilight books by Stephenie Meyer. In Sweden and Italy it has appeared in the top ten names in recent years.

The name was most popular in the US in the Victorian era and at the turn of the 20th century. It has been popularized by Alice in Wonderland, by Lewis Carroll. It was also popular in the Victorian era due to The Princess Alice, a daughter of Queen Victoria. In the US, Alice Roosevelt Longworth, daughter of Theodore Roosevelt, was occasionally known as "Princess Alice" in the press and inspired a song called "Alice Blue Gown".

Variants
Variants of the given name today include Alicia, Alison, and a short form, Allie, with many spelling variants. Alisa is a form of the name in popular use in Russia, Estonia and other countries. Aliki is the form used in Greek.

People with the first name Alice

Royalty 
 Alice of Antioch (1110 – after 1136), princess consort of Antioch by marriage to Bohemond II of Antioch 
 Alice of Cyprus (1193 – 1246), queen consort and later regent of Cyprus, later regent of Jerusalem
 Alice Heine (1872–1918), princess consort of Monaco, wife of Albert I of Monaco
 Princess Alice, Countess of Athlone (1883–1981), member of the British royal family
 Princess Alice of Battenberg (1885–1969), aka Princess Andrew of Greece and Denmark, mother of Prince Philip, Duke of Edinburgh
 Princess Alice of the United Kingdom (1843–1878), Grand Duchess of Hesse and by Rhine, daughter of Queen Victoria
 Alix of Hesse (1872–1918), Empress Alexandra Feodorovna of Russia, daughter of Princess Alice of the United Kingdom 
 Alice, Duchess of Gloucester (1901–2004), member of the British royal family
 Princess Alice of Parma (1849–1935), Grand Duchess of Tuscany

Authors and poets 
 Alice Adams (1926–1999), American author
 Alice Albinia (born 1976), author
 Alice Birch, British playwright and screenwriter
 Alice Cary (1820–1871), poet
 Alice Childress (1916–1994), American novelist and playwright 
 Alice Arnold Crawford (1850–1874), American poet
 Alice Turner Curtis (1860–1958), American writer
 Alice Williams Brotherton (1848–1930), American writer
 Alice May Douglas (1865–1943), American poet, author, editor
 Alice Dunbar Nelson (1875–1935), American poet, journalist and political activist
 Alice Flowerdew (1759–1830), English teacher, hymnwriter, religious poet
 Alice Fulton (born 1952), poet and author
 Alice Greenwood (1862–1935), British historian, teacher and writer
 Alice Hoffman (born 1952), author of Practical Magic
 Alice Emma Ives (1876–1930), American dramatist, journalist
 Alice Eleanor Jones (1916–1981), American science fiction writer and journalist
 Alice Pichen Lee (1883–1943), Chinese activist, newspaper editor, poet, writer and school founder
 Alice Priestley (born 1962), Canadian children's writer and illustrator
 Alice MacDonell (1854–1938), Scottish poet
 Alice Marriott (1910–1992), American historian
 Alice Moore McComas (1850–1919), American author, editor, lecturer, reformer
 Alice McDermott (born 1953), author
 Alice Duer Miller (1874–1942), author and poet
 Alice Munro (born 1931), Canadian author
 Alice Hobbins Porter (1854–1926), British-born American journalist, editor
 Alice Rivaz (1901–1998), Swiss author
 Alice Sebold (born 1963), author of The Lovely Bones
 Alice Sheldon, better known by her pen name James Tiptree Jr.
 Alice Spigelman, Hungarian-born Australian clinical psychologist, writer and human rights advocate
 Alice Tawhai, pen name of a New Zealand fiction writer
 Alice Thompson, Scottish novelist
 Alice Bellvadore Sams Turner (1859–1915), American physician, writer
 Alice Voinescu (1885–1961), Romanian writer
 Alice Walker (born 1944), author
 Alice Willard (1860–1936), American journalist and businesswoman
 Alice Robinson Boise Wood (1846–1919), American classicist and poet

Musicians 
 Alice (Visconti, born Carla Bissi) (born 1954), Italian singer-songwriter
 Alice (born Song Joo-hee), South Korean singer, a member of Hello Venus
 Alice Babs (1924–2014), Swedish singer and actress
 Alice Caymmi (born 1990), Brazilian singer
 Alice Coltrane (1937–2007), American jazz pianist
 Alice Cooper (born 1948), American male rock musician (see also The Alice Cooper Show and Alice Cooper Goes to Hell)
 Alice Coote (born 1968), British opera singer
 Alice Deejay, Dutch dance music artist
 Alice in Chains, American metal band
 Alice Glass (born 1988), Canadian vocalist in electronic duo Crystal Castles
 Alice Merton (born 1993), German-Canadian singer-songwriter
 Alice Nutter (born 1962), a member of the British music band Chumbawamba
 Alice Prin (1901–1953), French singer and actress
 Alice Carter Simmons (1883–1943), American pianist, organist, and music educator
 Alice Mary Smith (1839–1884), English composer
 Alice Spooner, keyboardist in English Grime/New Rave band Hadouken!
 Alice Vinette (1894–1989), Canadian composer

Actresses and filmmakers 
 Alice Barrett (born 1956), American actress
 Alice Bellagamba (born 1987), Italian actress and dancer
 Alice Brady (1892–1939), American actress
 Alice Calhoun (1900–1966), American silent film actress
 Alice Cocéa (1899–1970), French actress
 Alice Connor (born 1990), British actress
 Alice Davenport (1864–1936), American actress
 Alice Day (1906–1995), American actress
 Alice Dinnean (born 1969), American muppeteer
 Alice Diop (born 1979), French filmmaker
 Alice Dixson (born 1969), Filipino-American actress, commercial model, and former beauty queen
 Alice Dovey (18841969), American stage actress
 Alice Evans (born 1968), British-American actress
 Alice Eve, English actress
 Alice Faye (1915–1998), American actress and singer
 Alice Gale (1858–1941), American actress
 Alice Greczyn (born 1986), American actress
 Alice Guy-Blaché (1873–1968), French filmmaker
 Alice Hollister (1886–1973), American actress
 Alice Howell (1886–1961), American actress
 Alice Joyce (1890–1955), American silent film actress
 Alice Krige (born 1954), South African actress
 Alice Lake (1895–1967), American actress
 Alice Lowe (born 1977), English actress
 Ali MacGraw (born 1939), actress; birth name is Elizabeth Alice
 Alice Mann (actress) (1899–1986), American actress
 Alice Marriott (1824–1900), English actress
 Alice Moran, Canadian actress
 Alice Pearce (1917–1966), American actress
 Alice Ripley (born 1963), American actress
 Alice Robitaille (1923–2011), Canadian actress
 Alice B. Russell (1889–1985), American actress
 Alicia Silverstone (born 1976), American actress
 Alice Terry (1899–1987), American actress
 Alice Waddington (born 1990), Spanish filmmaker
 Alice White (1904–1983), American actress
 Aliki Vougiouklaki (1934–1996), Greek actress
 Alicia Vikander (born 1988), Swedish actress
 Alycia Debnam-Carey (born 1993), Australian actress

Science and medicine 
 Alice Mary Barry (1880–1955), pioneering Irish doctor
 Alice Fitzgerald (1875–1962), American nurse
 Alice Hamilton (1869–1970), American toxicologist
 Alice Miller (1923–2010), Swiss psychologist
 Alice Pruvot-Fol (1873–1972), French opisthobranch malacologist
 Alice Rivlin (1931–2019), American economist
 Alice Roberts (born 1973), British anatomist, osteoarchaeologist, anthropologist, television presenter, and author
 Alice Săvulescu (1905–1970), Romanian botanist
Alice Whitley (1913–1990), Australian chemist and educator
 Alice Wilson (1881–1964), Canadian geologist and paleontologist
 Alice Vrielink, conducts research in crystallography.

Activists 
 Alice Bunker Stockham (1833–1912), American suffragist
 Alice A. W. Cadwallader (1832–1910), American philanthropist and temperance activist
 Alice Davies (born 1870 – alive in 1919), British suffragette and nurse 
 Alice P. Gannett (1875–1962), American settlement house worker and social reformer
 Alice Sudduth Byerly (1855–1904), temperance activist
 Alice Hamilton (1869–1970), peace activist during "the Great War"
 Alice Herz (1882–1965), anti-war protester
 Alice Jouenne (1873-1954), French teacher and socialist activist
 Alice Meynell (1847–1922), English suffragist and poet
 Alice Milligan (1865–1953), Irish nationalist
 Alice Morrissey (died in 1912), British Catholic, socialist leader and suffragette 
 Alice Paul (1885–1977), American suffragist and British suffragette
 Alice E. Heckler Peters (1845–1921), American social reformer
 Alice Schwarzer (born 1942), German feminist and publisher
 Alice Ames Winter (1865–1944), American litterateur, author, clubwoman, suffragist

Athletes 
 Alice Blom (born 1980), Dutch volleyball player
 Alice D'Amato (born 2003), Italian artistic gymnast
 Alice Kertész (born 1935), Hungarian-born Olympic gymnastics medalist
 Alice Kinsella, (born 2001) British artistic gymnast
 Alisa Kleybanova (born 1989), Russian tennis player
 Alice Mills (born 1986), Australian Olympic swimmer
 Alice Noháčová (born 1967), Czech tennis player
 Alice Pirsu (born 1979), Romanian tennis player
 Alice Schlesinger (born 1988), Israeli Olympic judoka
 Alice Tortelli (born 1998), Italian footballer
 Alice Whitty (1934–2017), Canadian high jumper

Miscellaneous 
 Alice Auma (1956–2007), Ugandan spiritualist and medium
 Alice Austen (1866–1952), photographer
 Alice Ayres (1859–1885), an English nursemaid honoured for her bravery in rescuing children from a house fire
 Alice Bailey (1880–1949), theologist and lecturer
 Alice Barnham (1592–1650), wife of Francis Bacon
 Alice Bentinck (born 1986), co-founder and COO of Entrepreneur First, London
 Lady Alice Boyle (1566–1643), wife of David Barry, 1st Earl of Barrymore
 Alice Brock (born 1941), owner of the Massachusetts eatery that inspired the Arlo Guthrie tune "Alice's Restaurant Massacree"
 Alice Willson Broughton (1889–1980), First Lady of North Carolina
 Alice Brown Davis (1852–1935), Seminole tribal chief
 Alice Brusewitz, New Zealand photographer
 Alice Burdeu (born 1988), Australian fashion model and winner of Australia's Next Top Model, Cycle 3
 Alice Cambridge (1762–1829), early Irish Methodist preacher
 Alice Elizabeth Doherty (1887–1933), known for her rare condition of hypertrichosis lanuginosa
 Alice Dinnean (born 1969), American puppeteer
 Aliki Diplarakou (1912–2002), Greek Miss Europe winner
 Alice Mary Hagen (1872 – 1972), Canadian ceramic artist
 Alice Hanratty (born 1939), Irish artist
 Alice Houghton (1849–1920), Canadian-born American broker
 Alice Jacobsen (1928–1993), American sculptor 
 Alice Keppel (1868–1947), mistress of Edward VII of the United Kingdom
 Alice Elisabeth Kotalawala, Sri Lankan Sinhala businesswoman and philanthropist
 Alice Kyteler (1263–1325), first recorded person condemned for witchcraft in Ireland
 Alice Lau (disambiguation), several people
 Alice Liddell (1852–1934), the real person upon whom the eponymous heroine of Alice's Adventures in Wonderland is based
 Alice Lisle (1617–1685), a judge at the trial of Charles I of England
 Alice Little, (born 1990), Irish–American sex-worker and advocate
 Alice Roosevelt Longworth (1884–1980), only child of Theodore Roosevelt and his first wife, Alice Hathaway Lee
 Alice Maher (born 1956), Irish painter and sculptor
 Alice Mahon (1937–2022), British politician
 Alice Mak, Hong Kong artist and cartoonist
 Alice Manfield (1878–1960), or Guide Alice, Australian mountain guide, naturalist, photographer, chalet owner, and early feminist
 Alice Marriott (1907–2000), American businesswoman
 Alice Mofflin (1878–1961), Australian philanthropist and charity worker
 Lady Alice Christabel Montagu-Douglas-Scott (1901–2004), Duchess of Gloucester
 Alice Naylor-Leyland, fashion writer
 Alice Neel (1900–1984), American artist
 Alice Nordin (1871–1948), Swedish sculptor
 Alice Orlowski (1903–1976), high-ranking Nazi SS officer
 Alice Ormsby-Gore (1952–1995), British socialite
 Alice Parizeau (1930–1990), Polish journalist
 Alice Hathaway Lee Roosevelt (1861–1884), wife of Theodore Roosevelt
 Alice Strike (1896–2004), Canadian military veteran
 Alice B. Toklas (1877–1967), paramour of writer Gertrude Stein
 Alice Walton (born 1949), the daughter of Walmart founder Sam Walton
 Alice Waters (born 1944), American chef and restaurateur
 Alice Woods (1849–1941), British educationist
 Alice Young, first "witch" to be executed during the Salem witch trials

People with the surname Alice
 Antonio Alice (1886–1943), Argentine portrait painter
 Beatrice Kamuchanga Alice (born 1997), a long-distance runner from the Democratic Republic of the Congo
 Georgia Mannion (born 2003), professionally known as George Alice, Australian singer/songwriter
 Maria Alice de Fátima Rocha Silva (born 1971), known as Maria Alice, Cape Verdean singer
 Mary Alice (1936–2022), American film, television, and stage actress.

Fictional characters 
 As single name
 Alice, a character commonly featured in cryptography books together with her partner Bob
 Alice, the eponymous heroine of the Lewis Carroll novels Alice's Adventures in Wonderland and Through the Looking-Glass
 Alice Kingsleigh, a version of the above from the live adaptation Alice in Wonderland (2010)
 Miss Alice, a main character in Edward Albee's play Alice originally portrayed by Irene Worth
 Alice, a yet-to-be-seen character in the anime/manga Rozen Maiden by Peach-Pit
 Alice, the female protagonist in the manga Pandora Hearts
 Alice, a character from Sylvain Chomet's animated film The Illusionist
 Alice, a caffeine-crazed engineer from Scott Adams' comic strip Dilbert
 Alice, Peter's male pet rabbit in Meg Rosoff's book, Just in Case
 Alice, Mary Elizabeth's friend in Stephen Chbosky's novel The Perks of Being a Wallflower
 Alice, a fictional character from the television series The Tribe (1999–2003) played by Vanessa Stacey
 Alice (Transformers), a character in the 2009 movie Transformers: Revenge of the Fallen
 Alice, a fictional dancer from Konami's Dance Dance Revolution series
 Alice, a character in the 2012 adventure video game Zero Escape: Virtue's Last Reward initially introduced briefly in video game Nine Hours, Nine Persons, Nine Doors
 Alice, a spirit character taking the form of a hedgehog, from the video game "Spiritfarer"

 As given name

 Alice Abernathy, a fictional character in the Resident Evil film series, portrayed by Milla Jovovich
 Alice Angel, a character from the episodic puzzle horror video game Bendy and the Ink Machine
 Asmodeus Alice, a male character in the manga and anime series Welcome to Demon School! Iruma-kun
 Alice Ayres, pseudonym for Jane Jones (played by Natalie Portman) in the film Closer
 Alice Bastable, a character in E. Nesbit's The Story of the Treasure Seekers
 Alice Beckham, a character from anime series Machine Robo Rescue
 Alice Blue Bonnet, a character in the Make Mine Music short Johnny Fedora and Alice Blue Bonnet
 Alice Cartelet, a transfer student from the United Kingdom, one of the main characters from Kin-iro Mosaic manga and anime series
 Alice Carter in TV series Torchwood: Children of Earth
 Alice Cullen, vampire character in Stephenie Meyer's Twilight (novel series)
 Alice Elliot, a character from the Shadow Hearts series
 Alice the Fox, a crook fox from The Golden Key, or the Adventures of Buratino fairy tale
 Alice Gehabich, from Bakugan Battle Brawlers
 Alice the Goon, a character in the Popeye comic strip
 Alice the Great, a character in the animated children's series Little Bill
 Alice Green, a character from Big City Greens
 Alice Glick, a character from The Simpsons
 Alice Gunderson, a fictional character, the Quartermaines' maid on the American soap opera General Hospital
 Alice Hardy, a character in the Friday the 13th series
 Alice Hayfer, a character in the Nickelodeon sitcom Drake & Josh
 Alice Hiiragi, an antagonist from the video game Persona 5 Strikers
 Alice Horton, a fictional character, a matriarch on the American soap opera Days of Our Lives
 Alice Hyatt, protagonist on the American sitcom television series Alice
 Alice Johnson, a character in the Nightmare on Elm Street film series
 Alice Kramden, long-suffering wife of Ralph on the American sitcom The Honeymooners
 Alice Longbottom, mother of Neville Longbottom in the popular fictional Harry Potter series by J. K. Rowling
 Alice MacLeod, main character in Susan Juby's novel (2000) and the television series Alice, I Think
 Alice Margatroid, from the Touhou series of manic shooter
 Alice Martin is a minor character in the film Halloween II (1980) and murder victim of Michael Myers
 Alice McKinley is the protagonist of the eponymous book series by Phyllis Reynolds Naylor.
 Alice Mitchell, the mother of the title character of Dennis the Menace (US)
 Alice Nelson, the housekeeper for the Bradys on The Brady Bunch
 Alice Parslow, a main character in La Belle Sauvage, the first volume in The Book of Dust trilogy by Philip Pullman
 Alice Pieszecki, a fictional character from Showtime's lesbian drama series The L Word
 Alice Quinn, a character in The Magicians trilogy by Lev Grossman
 Alice the Rabbit, one of the main protagonists of the Bloody Roar fighting game series
 Alice (Alisa) Selezneva, the main heroine of Kir Bulychov's children's science fiction book series
 Alice Seno, a character from the manga Alice 19th
 Alice Tate, main character in Woody Allen's film Alice, portrayed by Mia Farrow
 Alice Twilight, a character in the Wii game No More Heroes 2: Desperate Struggle
 Alice Yotsuba, one of the main characters in the magical girl anime Dokidoki! PreCure
 Alice Zuberg, one of the female protagonists in the light novel and anime series Sword Art Online and one of the protagonists of the Alicization arc

References 

English feminine given names
French feminine given names